Persian Weekly  (Persian:
هفته نامه پرشین) is the only non-political, non-religious, non-affiliate and impartial weekly newspaper to exclusively serve the vibrant Iranian (Persian) community in United Kingdom and abroad IRAN .

History
Persian Weekly was first established and founded by Abbas Najafi Zarafshan in June 2007 for the purpose of serving the Persian community in London and United Kingdom.

Editors
Abbas Najafi Zarafshan (2007–present)

Features
Persian Weekly has a variety of sections including:

 Our Readers Views - Letters from readers.
 Births, Marriages & Deaths
 Entertainment - Includes events that are on in United Kingdom over the coming weeks.
 Classifieds - Advertising section for readers.
 Sport - Sport News.

Online
In March 2010 Persian Weekly relaunched their website to be a lot more editorially focused, instead of a standard blog.

References

External links 
 Persian Weekly website (persianweekly.co.uk)

Publications established in 2007
Weekly newspapers published in the United Kingdom
Persian-language newspapers
Newspapers published in London